Grandpa Green is a children's book by author and illustrator Lane Smith. It was published by Roaring Brook Press in 2011 and was selected as a Caldecott Honor Book in 2012.

Plot 

Grandpa Green's great-grandson travels through a garden he created. In the garden, he discovers Grandpa Green's lost memories, including living on a farm, having chickenpox, going to war, getting married, and starting a family.

Awards and honors 

 A New York Times Best Illustrated Book 2011
 Publishers Weekly Best Children's Picture Books title for 2011
 One of School Library Journal's Best Picture Books of 2011 
 Nominated for Caldecott Honor Book in 2012

References 

2011 children's books
American picture books
Caldecott Honor-winning works
Roaring Brook Press books